Olle Jonas Olsson (born 10 March 1983) is a Swedish former professional footballer who played as a defender. Beginning his career with Landskrona BoIS in 2003, he went on to represent NEC Nijmegen, West Bromwich Albion, and Djurgårdens IF before retiring at Wigan Athletic in 2019. A full international between 2010 and 2015, he won 25 caps for the Swedish national team and represented his country at Euro 2012.

Club career

Early career
Olsson was born in Landskrona and made his debut in professional football in 2003 as part of the Landskrona BoIS squad. Olsson is considered to be a very tough defender, playing as a centreback or leftback. He considers fellow Swedish defender Olof Mellberg to be an inspiration.

Two years later he was sold for €750,000 to Dutch side NEC Nijmegen. While playing in Sweden Olsson was known for his physical play and in 2004 he was the player who picked up the most cautions that year. Playing for NEC Nijmegen evolved his game and the cautions became a thing of the past. Olsson himself says that the Dutch man–man marking approach to defense has improved his game.

He was linked with a move to the Premiership several times with Bolton Wanderers, Middlesbrough, Newcastle United and Everton. Olsson scored three goals in the Eredivisie in 2007–08.

West Bromwich Albion
On 22 August 2008, Olsson was linked with a move to West Bromwich Albion.
On 29 August 2008 West Bromwich Albion confirmed his signing subject to a medical for an initial fee of £800,000 with a possible £360,000 of performance related add ons.

Olsson made his first appearance, starting against West Ham United on 13 September 2008. He scored his first goal for West Bromwich, in a 1–0 win away to Middlesbrough. Olsson went on to score two more goals in the 2008–09 season. The first coming in the FA Cup against Peterborough, and the second was the first goal in West Brom's 3–0 win over Sunderland on 25 April 2009.

In a match against Doncaster Rovers on 15 September 2009, Olsson headed two goals. Thirteen days later, he signed a new four-year deal which is set to keep him at the club until 2013. On 23 October 2010, Olsson picked up an Achilles tendon injury during the win over Fulham and was ruled out for up to six weeks. He then made his return to the starting line-up against Blackburn Rovers on 23 January 2011, completing the full 90 minutes, partnering Gabriel Tamas in defence in a 2–0 defeat at Ewood Park. At the end of the 2011–12 season, he made 34 appearances in all competitions, all of which were starting berths.

The following season Gareth McAuley joined West Bromwich on a free transfer. Olsson and McAuley formed a strong partnership throughout the season playing a major part in the club's highest finish for 30 years in tenth place.

On 6 October 2012, it was announced that Olsson had signed a new four-year contract with West Bromwich, ensuring he would remain with the team until 2016.

Djurgårdens IF

In March 2017, Olsson and West Bromwich agreed to a mutual termination of the remainder of Olsson's contract, and he departed Albion after nine years with the club to join Djurgårdens IF, signing a two-year contract. He decided to return to Sweden after facing stiff competition for playing time at West Bromwich, with only 7 club appearances in his final season. His move to Djurgården was part of a string of high-profile acquisitions by the club, which included the return to Djurgården of two of Olsson's former Sweden national team teammates: Kim Källström earlier in the offseason, and Andreas Isaksson the season before. On 10 May 2018 he played as Djurgården beat Malmö FF 3–0 in the Swedish Cup Final.

Wigan Athletic

On 1 February 2019 Olsson signed a deal with Wigan Athletic that stretches until the end of the season. "I am delighted to be back. I have been missing the UK a lot and I always feel more British than Swedish in a sense," Olsson told the club website. He was released by the club in July 2019.

International career
Olsson was a regular for the Sweden under 21-squad. He was capped 19 times, scoring one goal.

Olsson was included in new coach Erik Hamrén's squad for the friendlies against Bosnia and Herzegovina and Belarus in 2010. He never came off the bench in the match against Bosnia and Herzegovina. The next match against Belarus saw Olsson play from start. On 15 May 2012, 29-year-old Olsson was named in the 23-man squad and handed the number 13 shirt for Euro 2012 held in Poland and the Ukraine, along with two other Premier League stars, Blackburn's Martin Olsson and Sunderland's set-piece specialist Sebastian Larsson.

Television work
When Swedish cable network Viasat acquired the broadcasting rights for the 2010–11 Premier League season, the network hired several new television presenters and journalists. Olsson has signed up with Viasat and will appear via satellite link and telephone to provide a players perspective on the matches and the Premier League. He added that this will give him a chance to promote West Bromwich Albion in Sweden. On 15 April 2012, he appeared as a guest pundit on BBC's Match of the Day 2.

Personal life
When not playing football, Olsson enjoys playing the guitar. He lists Bob Dylan, Nirvana, The Rolling Stones, Oasis, Babyshambles, The Chardogs and The Who as some of his favourite artists.

Olsson has stated that once he is done with his professional football career, he wants to qualify as a lawyer and work within the sphere of human rights. He has already taken introduction classes on the subject in Sweden.

Career statistics

Club

International
International appearances and goals per year

International goals

Honours
Djurgårdens IF
 Svenska Cupen: 2017–18

References

External links
Jonas Olsson player profile at wba.co.uk

Premier League profile of Jonas Olsson
BBC Sport profile of Jonas Olsson

1983 births
Living people
Swedish footballers
Footballers from Skåne County
Swedish expatriate footballers
Landskrona BoIS players
NEC Nijmegen players
West Bromwich Albion F.C. players
Premier League players
Allsvenskan players
Eredivisie players
Expatriate footballers in the Netherlands
Expatriate footballers in England
UEFA Euro 2012 players
English Football League players
Sweden international footballers
Sweden under-21 international footballers
Djurgårdens IF Fotboll players
Association football defenders